Haucourt is the name or part of the name of several communes in France:
 Haucourt, Oise, in the Oise department
 Haucourt, Pas-de-Calais, in the Pas-de-Calais department
 Haucourt, Seine-Maritime, in the Seine-Maritime department
 Haucourt-en-Cambrésis, in the Nord department
 Haucourt-Moulaine, in the Meurthe-et-Moselle department